

Cities and Towns in Changlang District 
Bordumsa
Bubang
Changlang (North and South)
Chopelling
Deban
Dharampur
Gandhigram
Jairampur
Kharsang
Khemiyong
Kherem Bisa
Kutum
Lallung
Manabhum
Manmao
Miao
Namchik
Namdang
Namphai
Nampong
Namtok
New Kamlao
New Mohang
Rajanagar
Rangfrah
Ranglom
Two-hat
Vijaynagar
Vijoypur
Yangkang

Cities and Towns in Dibang Valley District 
Alinye
Anelih
Anini
Etalin

Cities and Towns in East Kameng District 
Bameng
Bana
Chyangtajo
Khenewa
Lada
P.kessang
Palizi
Pipu-dipu
Seijosa
Seppa
Thrizino
Veo

Cities and Towns of East Siang District 
Adipasi
Ayeng
Balek
Bilat
Boleng
Borguli
Dalbing
Damro
Debing
Gtc
Hill Top
Kebang
Korang
Koyu
Ledum
Mebo
Namsing
Nari
Ngopok
Oyan
Pangin
Pasighat
Rani
Renging
Riga
Ruksin
Sille
Silluk
Sirem
Yagrung
Mirem
Mikong
Debing
Miglung

Cities and Towns in Kurung Kumey District 
Chambang
Damin
Hiya
Koloriang
Nyapin
Palin
Sangram
Sarli
Tali

Cities and Towns in Lohit District  

 Alubari

Chakma
Changliang
Chowkham
Danglat
Gohaingaon
Innao
Jaipur
Kamlang Nagar
Kherem
Kumari Kachari
Kumsai
Lathao
Lohitpur
Loiliang
Mahadevpur
Manmao
Medo
Momong
Namsai
Nanam
Peyong
Podumani
Sunpura
Tafragram
Tezu
Tezu Covt.college
Tindolong
Udaipur
Wakro
Wingko
Yealing

Cities and Towns of Lower Dibang Valley District 
Abango
Anupam
Bijari
Bolung
Bomjir
Dambuk
Desali
Elopa
Hunli
Iduli
Jia
Koranu
Kronli
Meka
Paglam
Parbuk
Roing
Santipur

Cities and Towns of Lower Subansiri District 
Boasimla
Chimpu
Deed
Godak
Hija
Joram
Mengio
Old Ziro
Raga
Ranga Nadi Project
Talo
Yachuli
Yazali
Ziro

Cities and Towns of Papum Pare District 
A P Sectt.
Arunachal University
Balijan
Banderdewa
Doimukh
Donyi-Polo
Hawa Camp
Itanagar
Kheel
Kimin
Kokila
Midpu
Model Village
Naharlagun
Nirjuli
Ram Krishna Mission
Saglee
Sonajuli
Vivek Vihar
Yupia

Cities and Towns of Tawang District 
B.supply
Gispu
Jang
Kitpi
Lhou
Lumberdung
Lumla
Mukto
Sakpret
Tawang
Temple Gompa
Thingbu
Zimithang

Cities and Towns of Tirap District 
Borduria
Dadam
Deomali
Hukanjuri
K/nokno
Kaimai
Kanubari
Kapu
Khela
Kheti
Khonsa
Khonsa Basti
Khotnu
Lazu
Longding
Longfong
Minthong
Nampong
Namsang
Namsang Mukh
Narottam Nagar
Nginu
Niausa
Panchou
Senewa
Soha
Thinsa
Tissa
Tupi
Valley View
Wakka

Cities and Towns of Upper Siang District 
Geku
Gelling
Karko
Mariyang
Migging
Shimong
Singa
Tuting
Yingkiong

Cities and Towns of Upper Subansiri District 
Daporijo
Dumporijo
Giba
Lemiking
Lepajaring
Maro
Muri
Nacho
Sippi
Siyum
Tabarijo
Taksing
Taliha

Cities and Towns of West Kameng District 
Balemu
Bhalukpong
Bomdila
Dahung
Dedza
 Dirang
Dirang Basti
Kalaktang
Khellong
Lish
Munna Camp
Nafra
Rupa
Salari
Sangti
Senge
Shergaon
Singchung
Tenga Market
Tenzingaon
Tippi

Cities and Towns in West Siang District 
Along
Bagra
Bame
Basar
Bene
Dali
Darak
Daring
Darka
Garu
Gensi
Kambang
Kaying
Kombo
Likabali
Liromoba
Logum Jining
Mechuka
Monigong
Nikte
Payum
Rumgong
Tato
Tirbin
Vivek Nagar
Yoji Yora
Yomcha

References

Cities and towns